Ancylobacter aquaticus is a bacterium from the family of Xanthobacteraceae which has been isolated from lake water in Copenhagen in Denmark. Ancylobacter aquaticus can degrade  1,2-dichloroethane and produces haloalkane dehalogenase.

References

Further reading

External links
Type strain of Ancylobacter aquaticus at BacDive -  the Bacterial Diversity Metadatabase

Hyphomicrobiales
Bacteria described in 1983